Sir William Fowle Middleton, 1st Baronet (8 November 1748 – 26 December 1829) was an English Member of Parliament and High Sheriff.

He was born William Middleton in Charleston, South Carolina, the eldest son of William Middleton of Crowfield and the grandson of Arthur Middleton, acting governor of South Carolina. He was educated at Bury St Edmunds Grammar School and Caius College, Cambridge and succeeded his father in 1775.

He was pricked High Sheriff of Suffolk for 1782–83. In 1784 he was elected MP for Ipswich, sitting until 1790. He was re-elected for the same constituency for 1803 to 1806 and finally for Hastings in 1806. He was created a baronet in 1804.

He purchased the Shrubland estate in the late 1700s and in 1823 adopted the additional name of Fowle under the will of John Fowle of Broome, Norfolk.

He had married Harriot, the daughter and eventual heiress of Nathaniel Acton of Bramford Hall, Suffolk and had 1 son and 2 daughters. He was succeeded by his only son, Sir William Fowle Middleton, 2nd Baronet. His daughter Sarah Louisa married Philip Broke, later Rear-Admiral Sir Philip Bowes Vere Broke, 1st Baronet.

See also
 Middleton baronets

References

|-

|-

1748 births
1829 deaths
Alumni of Gonville and Caius College, Cambridge
Baronets in the Baronetage of the United Kingdom
High Sheriffs of Suffolk
Members of the Parliament of Great Britain for Ipswich
British MPs 1784–1790
Members of the Parliament of the United Kingdom for Ipswich
UK MPs 1802–1806
UK MPs 1806–1807
Tory MPs (pre-1834)